Viva Last Blues is the third studio album by Will Oldham. It was released under the moniker Palace Music on Drag City in 1995. The album features Oldham on vocals and guitar, and was recorded by Steve Albini.

Critical reception

Pitchfork placed the album at number 60 on the "Top 100 Albums of the 1990s" list. In 2007, Blender placed it at number 98 on the "100 Greatest Indie-Rock Albums Ever" list.

Track listing

Personnel
Credits adapted from liner notes.

 Liam Hayes – piano, organ
 Jason Loewenstein – drums, additional vocals
 Ned Oldham – bass guitar, slide guitar, additional vocals
 Will Oldham – vocals, guitar
 Bryan Rich – lead guitar
 Steve Albini – recording
 Eric Bates – engineering
 Eugene Bates – engineering
 Dianne Bellino – cover drawing
 Cynthia Kirkwood – painting

References

External links
 

1995 albums
Will Oldham albums
Domino Recording Company albums
Drag City (record label) albums
Albums produced by Steve Albini